Nitro+chiral is a subsidiary of the Japanese visual novel company Nitroplus that focuses on creating BL eroge visual novels.

History
The company was formed in 2004 and released their first work, Togainu no Chi, in 2005. Their second game, Lamento -Beyond the Void- was released in 2006. A fan disc named Chiral Mori was released in 2008. It is an amusement disc that includes three minigames and features the characters of their first two games. While Togainu no Chi and Lamento were adult games, Chiral Mori was given an approval for all ages. Their third game, Sweet Pool was also released in 2008 for adults only. During the same year, Togainu no Chi was re-released on PlayStation 2 for ages 15+ and called Togainu no Chi True Blood.

In 2010, Togainu no Chi was ported to the PSP handheld consoles as Togainu no Chi True Blood Portable. Nitro+chiral released their fourth game, Dramatical Murder, in 2012. A fan disc of Dramatical Murder called Dramatical Murder re:connect and featuring additional scenes and songs was released in 2013. A 15+ PlayStation Vita port of the game called Dramatical Murder re:code was released in 2014. In 2015, Togainu no Chi was ported to iPhone and Android devices; both versions are based on the PlayStation 2 port for ages 15+. In 2016, Nitro+chiral re-released Togainu no Chi, Lamento: Beyond the Void and Sweet Pool for the Windows 10 operating system. In 2021, Nitro+chiral released their fifth game, Slow Damage. Within the same year, a browser based mobile side story called Slow Damage: Clean Dishes was released, featuring all new characters within the same setting as its original game. 

On July 4, 2018, it was announced at the Anime Expo that JAST USA's new JAST Blue branch, which focuses on boys-love games, will release Nitro+CHiRAL's visual novel titles in English.

On June 14, 2021, JAST Blue announced that they will be postponing their localization of Lamento -Beyond the Void- indefinitely.

Video games

Staff
Producer: Dejitarou
Director: Gen Urobuchi
Illustrator: Seiji Onitsuka, now Honyarara
Scenario Writer: Kabura Fuchii
Graphics: Namaniku ATK
Script: Reito Chiyoko
SD Character Illustrator: Yuupon
Public Relations: Chiral-kun

Former Staff
Illustrator: Kana Tatana (who now uses the name Chinatsu Kurahana)

Music Performance 
Kanako Itou
ZIZZ STUDIO
Kazuhiro Watanabe
Pale Green
GOATBED
VERTUEUX
 Seiji Kimura

External links
Nitro+CHiRAL
Nitroplus
Chinatsu Kurahana

References

Video game development companies